Berducedo is a parish (administrative division) in Allande, a municipality within the province and autonomous community of Asturias, in northern Spain. The population is 166 (INE 2011). The postal code is 33887.

Villages and hamlets
 Baldedo
 Berducedo
 Las Cabañas
 Castello
 El Castro
 Corondeño
 La Figuerina ("A Figueiría")
 La Grandera ("A Grandeira")
 Teijedo ("Teixedo")
 Trapa
 Trellopico

References

External links
 Asturian society of economic and industrial studies, English language version of "Sociedad Asturiana de Estudios Económicos e Industriales" (SADEI)

Parishes in Allande